Laurence Louppe (1938 – 5 February 2012) was a French writer, critic and historian of dance, a specialist in the aesthetics of dance and visual arts and a choreographic artist.

Biography 
Laurence Louppe taught at the université du Québec à Montréal, at the Performing Arts Research and Training Studios in Brussels, and created a higher education in choreographic culture at the  Cefedem-Sud in Aubagne. She was made a Chevalier of the Ordre des Arts et des Lettres 1 January 2009.

Some publications and collaborations 
1991: La Matière et la Forme
1991 Danses tracées : dessins et notation des chorégraphes, exhibition catalog
1993: Richard Deacon, Hervé Robbe, Noisiel, La Ferme du buisson ; Londres, British council
1997: Poétique de la danse contemporaine, coll. « La pensée du Mouvement », éditions Contredanse, Brussels .
2000: L'Histoire de la danse. Repères dans le cadre du diplôme d'État
2007: Poétique de la danse contemporaine, la suite, éditions Contredanse, Brussels .

References

External links 
 Les notations en danse, gardiennes de l'invention on IRCAM
 Usages de la phénoménologie dans les études en danse, L’exemple de Laurence Louppe on danse.revues.org
 Publications on CAIRN

20th-century French non-fiction writers
21st-century French non-fiction writers
20th-century French women writers
21st-century French women writers
Chevaliers of the Ordre des Arts et des Lettres
Writers from Lyon
1938 births
2012 deaths